The Combat Recognition Ribbon was a tentative military award of the United States Army which was first proposed in the mid 1980s as an Army equivalent to the United States Navy’s Combat Action Ribbon.

The primary justification for the creation of the Combat Recognition Ribbon was that the Department of the Army recognizes combat service with the Combat Infantryman Badge; however, this decoration is closed to all but infantry personnel or special case requests 
from members of other Army branches, provided a special order is issued for the Combat Infantryman Badge.  The Combat Recognition Ribbon was initially proposed as an award for Army personnel who had served in combat situations, but for a variety of reasons had failed to meet the criteria for the Combat Infantryman Badge.

The National Defense Authorization Act (NDAA) of 2005 required that the Secretary of the Army establish the Combat Recognition Ribbon (CRR).  As of February 2005, the Department of the Army began the very initial stages of developing the Combat Recognition Ribbon.  The proposed ribbon was eventually renamed and reclassed as the Combat Action Badge. The Combat Action Badge creation was approved by the U.S. Army on May 2, 2005 and can be retroactively awarded to soldiers who engaged in combat after September 18, 2001.

With the creation of the Combat Action Badge, the proposal for the Combat Recognition Ribbon was dropped by the United States Army and the ribbon is now considered obsolete.  The award itself was never actually officially created and a physical ribbon design was never proposed by the Institute of Heraldry.

Awards and decorations of the United States Army
Military ribbons of the United States